The canton of Crécy-sur-Serre is a former administrative division in northern France. It was disbanded following the French canton reorganisation which came into effect in March 2015. It consisted of 19 communes, which joined the canton of Marle in 2015. It had 7,963 inhabitants (2012).

The canton comprised the following communes:

Assis-sur-Serre
Barenton-Bugny
Barenton-Cel
Barenton-sur-Serre
Bois-lès-Pargny
Chalandry
Chéry-lès-Pouilly
Couvron-et-Aumencourt
Crécy-sur-Serre
Dercy
Mesbrecourt-Richecourt
Montigny-sur-Crécy
Mortiers
Nouvion-et-Catillon
Nouvion-le-Comte
Pargny-les-Bois
Pouilly-sur-Serre
Remies
Verneuil-sur-Serre

Demographics

See also
Cantons of the Aisne department

References

Former cantons of Aisne
2015 disestablishments in France
States and territories disestablished in 2015